Yasherganovo (Yäşergän) is a rural locality (a selo) and the administrative centre of Yasherganovsky Selsoviet, Sterlibashevsky District, Bashkortostan, Russia. The population was 620 as of 2010. There are 8 streets.

Geography 
Yasherganovo is located 35 km southwest of Sterlibashevo (the district's administrative centre) by road. Nizhneibrayevo is the nearest rural locality.

References 

Rural localities in Sterlibashevsky District